Peter Parros (born November 11, 1960) is an American actor and screenwriter. His acting credits include stage, screen and television. Parros portrays Judge David Harrington on Tyler Perry's The Haves and the Have Nots airing on the Oprah Winfrey Network, but he may be most recognized for his nearly decade-long portrayal of Dr. Ben Harris on the CBS soap As the World Turns.

Biography

Early life
Peter Parros was born in Brooklyn, New York, but grew up in Los Angeles and Salt Lake City. He became interested in acting and the film industry after holding a job with a company that created special effects miniatures. When interviewed, he referred to the initial stages of his acting endeavor as being completely different than what other actors and actresses found. He said, "What drew me in wasn't the Shakespearean quality of acting. I was going to be the black Arnold Schwarzenegger."

Career
Initially, Parros acted solely in theater. Eventually, he found minor success on screen. In 1984, Parros landed his first television role as Michael, Tootie's cousin, in The Facts of Life. His first regular series role was on Knight Rider in 1985, playing "RC3", a.k.a. Reginald Cornelius III, the semi truck driver (and sometime partner to Michael Knight) who also worked on KITT; he appeared in the fourth and final season of the series. Knight Rider has appeared in syndication in over 200 countries throughout the world, most notably in Australia, Canada, Germany, and the United Kingdom.

Thereafter, Parros was cast in several popular American soap operas. He appeared on The Young and the Restless in the recurring role of Leo Baines from 1986 to 1987, Santa Barbara in 1992, One Life to Live as the second Dr. Ben Price from 1994 until 1995, and on As the World Turns as Dr. Benjamin "Ben" Robert Harris from 1996 to 2005. Parros also starred in the short-lived The New Adam-12, a spin-off of the 1960s/1970s popular police drama Adam-12, as Officer Gus Grant. In 1990–91, he played the recurring role of firefighter Eddie Cooper on the CBS comedy The Family Man. Parros most recently in Tyler Perry’s The Haves and the Have Nots, a hit show for Oprah Winfrey’s OWN Channel.

Parros has made guest appearances on such TV shows as Charles in Charge, Star Trek: The Next Generation, and New York Undercover.

Filmography

Film

Television

References

External links
 

1960 births
Living people
Male actors from New York City
African-American male actors
American male film actors
American male soap opera actors
American male television actors
People from Bloomfield, New Jersey
People from Brooklyn
Male actors from Los Angeles
Male actors from Salt Lake City
21st-century African-American people
20th-century African-American people